The NBA G League Basketball Executive of the Year is an NBA G League award given for the first time in 2015–16 to the top front office executive involved in basketball operations. The award is determined by peer voting. Sioux Falls Skyforce general manager Adam Simon was the inaugural winner.

Winners

References

National Basketball Association lists
Executive of the year
Awards established in 2016